Mount Strathcona is a mountain, 1,380 m high, rising above the continental ice on the west side of Denman Glacier, 11 miles south of Mount Barr Smith, in Antarctica. It was discovered by the Australasian Antarctic Expedition under Douglas Mawson, 1911–14, and named by him for Lord Strathcona, High Commissioner for Canada in 1911, a patron of the expedition.

References

Mountains of Queen Mary Land